Craugastor adamastus is a species of frog in the family Craugastoridae. It is endemic to Guatemala and only known from its type locality near Aldea Vista Hermosa, on the northern slopes of the eastern portion of the Sierra de las Minas, where the type series was collected in 1980–1981.

Etymology
The specific name adamastus honors Jay M. Savage,  in recognition of "his many contributions to herpetology, especially in the area of the biology of Eleutherodactylus" (n.b.—this species was originally described as Eleutherodactylus adamastus). It is derived from the Greek adamastos that means "untamed, wild, or savage".

Description
The type series consists of seven individuals Three adult males and two adult females were measured: the males measure  and the females  in snout–vent length. The snout is ovoid in dorsal view and truncate in profile. The canthus rostralis is well-defined. The tympanum is distinct in males and indistinct in females. The fingers and toes bear discs; the toes have moderate webbing while the fingers are unwebbed. The upper parts of the body, flanks, and upper surface of limbs are strongly granular. The largest tubercles are on the flanks. Dorsal coloration is more or less uniformly brown, but most specimens have a weak inter-orbital bar and a marking below the eye. The larger tubercles are mostly gray. The venter is yellowish to cream with numerous dark brown melanophores that make a vermiculate pattern on belly and thighs.

Habitat and conservation
Individuals were mostly seen perched on leaf litter or rocks along or near streams, but one individuals was under a rock near a stream.

Craugastor adamastus is threatened by habitat loss caused by agricultural activity and wood extraction, and by water pollution. The type locality, however, is in the Sierra de las Minas Biosphere Reserve. Chytridiomycosis is possibly behind the dramatic declines seen in many other stream-dwelling frogs, and could also affect this species.

References

adamastus
Endemic fauna of Guatemala
Amphibians of Guatemala
Amphibians described in 1994
Taxa named by Jonathan A. Campbell
Taxonomy articles created by Polbot